Penington is a surname indicating a family origin in Pennington, Lancashire; Pennington, Cumbria; or Pennington, Hampshire. Some members of the family changed the spelling to Pennington in the 14th century.

Those bearing it include:

David Penington (1930–2023), Australian doctor
Isaac Penington (Lord Mayor) (1584–1661), English merchant and Lord Mayor of the City of London
Isaac Penington (Quaker) (1616–1679), English religious activist, son of the aforementioned Isaac
Sir Isaac Pennington (1745–1817), British physician
John B. Penington (1825–1902), American politician

See also
Pennington (surname)
Pennington (disambiguation)

References

English-language surnames
English toponymic surnames
Lists of people by surname